Mile High: The Comeback of Cannabis is a 2014 documentary film directed by Anthony Hashem and featuring comedian activist Adam Hartle.

To promote the film, Hartle and Hashem distributed free cannabis at screenings in Colorado, where marijuana is legal.

References

Further reading

External links

2014 films
American documentary films about cannabis
Documentary films about cannabis
2010s American films